Couto de Magalhães de Minas is a Brazilian municipality located in the north-center of the state of Minas Gerais. Its population  was 4,423 living in a total area of 484 km². The city belongs to the statistical mesoregion of Jequitinhonha and to the statistical microregion of Diamantina.  It became a municipality in 1963.

Couto de Magalhães de Minas is located at an elevation of 1155 meters in the upper Jequitinhonha River valley.  It is northeast of Diamantina to which it is connected by federal highway BR-367

The distance to Diamantina is 39 km; and the distance to Belo Horizonte is 320 km.

The main economic activities are services, agriculture, and small industries.  The GDP in 2005 was R$18 million, with 11 million from services, 4 million from industry, and 1 million from agriculture.  There were 126 rural producers on 14,000 hectares of land.  Only 9 farms had tractors (2006).  The main crops were sugarcane, beans, corn, and soybeans.  There were 2,000 head of cattle (2006).

The social indicators rank it in the middle tier of municipalities in the state.
Municipal Human Development Index: 0.712 (2000)
State ranking: 488 out of 853 municipalities 
National ranking: 2769 out of 5,138 municipalities  
Literacy rate: 83%
Life expectancy: 69 (average of males and females)

The highest ranking municipality in Minas Gerais in 2000 was Poços de Caldas with 0.841, while the lowest was Setubinha with 0.568.  Nationally the highest was São Caetano do Sul in São Paulo with 0.919, while the lowest was Setubinha.  In more recent statistics (considering 5,507 municipalities) Manari in the state of Pernambuco has the lowest rating in the country—0,467—putting it in last place.

There was one health clinic in 2005.  Patients with more serious health conditions are transported to Diamantina.  Educational needs were met by 5 primary schools and 2 middle schools.

References

See also
 List of municipalities in Minas Gerais

Municipalities in Minas Gerais